Layyah (Saraiki and ), previously spelled as Leiah, is a city in the Pakistan. The city is headquarter of Layyah District and Layyah Tehsil. It is the 72nd largest city in Pakistan.

The main languages spoken in the city include Saraiki, Punjabi, and Urdu.

Geography
It lies between 30–45 to 31–24 deg north latitudes and 70–44 to 71–50 deg east longitudes. The area consists of a semi-rectangular block of sandy land between the Indus River and the Chenab River in Sindh Sagar Doab. The total area covered by the district is 6,291 km2 with a width from east to west of 88 km and a length from north to south of 72 km.

History
The town was founded around 1550 by Kamal Khan Mirani, a descendant of Ghazi Khan Mirani who laid foundation of Dera Ghazi Khan. The region was part of Multan province of Mughal Empire. Around 1610, the town was taken from the Mirani rulers by the Jaskani Balochs, who held it until 1787. Abdun Nabi Sarai was appointed Governor by Timur Shah Durrani, but three years later it was included in the Governorship of Muhammad Khan Sadozai, who transferred his seat of Government to Mankera. In 1794, Humayun Shah, the rival claimant to the throne of Kabul, was captured near Layyah and brought into the town, where his eyes were put out by order of Zaman Shah. Under the Sikh Government, the town once more became the centre of administration for the neighbouring tract, and after the British occupation in 1849, was for a time the headquarters of a Civil Administrative Division. This administrative status of Layyah was short-lived and the British reduced it to the level of Tehsil headquarters, making it a part of Dera Ismail Khan. In 1901, Layyah was transferred to the new District of Mianwali. Later on, it was made part of the Muzaffargarh District. In 1982, Layyah Tehsil was upgraded to District headquarters comprising three Tehsils: Layyah, Karor and Chaubara. The municipality was created in 1875.

See also
Mirani dynasty
Multan
Punjab

References

External links
Layyah Government
Layyah Online
District Courts of Layyah
A Brief History of Layyah
Layyah, Pakistan: Radical Islam Fills Void - video report by Global Post

Populated places in Layyah District